Caspar Buberl (1834 – August 22, 1899) was an American sculptor.  He is best known for his Civil War monuments, for the terra cotta relief panels on the Garfield Memorial in Cleveland, Ohio (depicting the various stages of James Garfield's life), and for the -long frieze on the Pension Building in Washington, D.C.

Biography
Born in Königsberg, Bohemia, (now Kynšperk nad Ohří, Czech Republic), as a young man Buberl studied art in Prague and Vienna before immigrating to the United States in 1854 to train under sculptor Robert Eberhard Launitz.

He married Anna Stubner in 1856, and they had nine children.

In 1882 Montgomery C. Meigs was chosen to design and construct the new Pension Building, now the National Building Museum, in Washington D. C. and, in doing so, broke away from the established Greco-Roman models that had been the basis of government buildings in Washington up until then, and was to continue to be following the Pension Building's completion. Meigs based his design on Italian Renaissance precedents, notably Rome's Palazzo Farnese and Plazzo della Cancelleria.

Included in his design was a -long sculptured frieze executed by Buberl.  Since creating a work of sculpture of that size was well out of Meigs' budget, he had Buberl create 28 different scenes [totaling  in length), which were then mixed and slightly modified to create the continuous parade that includes over 1,300 individual figures.  Because of the way that the 28 sections were modified and intermixed, it is only by somewhat careful examination that the frieze reveals itself to be the same figures repeated some eighteen times.  The sculpture includes infantry, navy, artillery, cavalry and medical components as well as a good deal of the supply and quartermaster functions, since Meigs had overseen the latter two functions during the Civil War.

Meigs insisted that any teamster included in the Quartermaster panel "must be a negro, a plantation slave, freed by war".  This figure was ultimately to assume a position in the center, over the west entrance to the building.

Buberl created dozens of Civil War statues and monuments for various cities and states, including several for New York veterans associations to be placed on the Gettysburg Battlefield and a bronze bust of President Abraham Lincoln, which was recently sold for $5,800.  His impressive New York State Monument crowns Cemetery Hill, and a number of individual memorials for specific regiments dot the battlefield.

He died at his studio in New York City.

Leading works

Monuments on the Gettysburg battlefield
 9th New York Cavalry Monument – dedicated July 1, 1888
 4th New York Independent Battery – dedicated July 2, 1888
 5th New York Cavalry Monument – dedicated July 3, 1888
 126th New York Infantry – dedicated October 3, 1888
 10th New York Cavalry Monument – dedicated October 9, 1888
 54th New York Infantry – dedicated July 4, 1890
 111th New York Infantry Monument – dedicated June 26, 1891
 New York State Monument – dedicated July 2, 1893
 41st New York Infantry – dedicated July 3, 1893
 52nd New York Infantry – dedicated July 3, 1893

Other Civil War monuments

Civil War Monument, Manchester, New Hampshire, George Keller, architect, 1879
Soldiers and Sailors Monument, Buffalo, New York, George Keller, architect, 1884
Soldiers and Sailors Monument, Nashua, New Hampshire, 1889
Alexandria Confederate Memorial, Alexandria, Virginia, 1889
 Soldiers and Sailors Monument, Troy, New York, 1890.
 Four relief panels: Cavalry, Artillery, Infantry, The Monitor and the Merrimac
A.P. Hill Monument, Richmond, Virginia, 1892
Howitzer Monument, Richmond, Virginia, 1892
Confederate Monument, University of Virginia Cemetery, Charlottesville, Virginia, 1893
Raphael Semmes Monument, Mobile, Alabama, 1899

Other memorials and monuments
Fulton Memorial, Fulton Park, Brooklyn, New York, 1872
Fireman's Memorial, Church Square Park, Hoboken, New Jersey, 1891
Dewey Triumphal Arch, Spanish–American War, New York City, 1899

Architectural sculpture

Columbia Defending Science and Industry, National Museum/Art and Industries Building, Washington, D.C., Adolph Cluss, architect, Montgomery Meigs, associate architect, 1881
Pension Building Frieze, National Building Museum, Washington, D.C., Montgomery Meigs, architect, 1883
James A. Garfield Memorial, Lake View Cemetery, Cleveland, Ohio, George Keller, architect, 1890
Soldiers and Sailors Memorial Arch, Hartford, Connecticut, George Keller, architect, 1890

Pension Building frieze

Images of the James A. Garfield Memorial

Images of Hartford memorial

Images of Buffalo memorial

Footnotes

References
Camden, Richard N., Outdoor Sculpture of Ohio, Chagrin Falls, Ohio: West Summit Press,   1980.
Craven, Wayne, The Sculpture at Gettysburg, Gettysburg, Pennsylvania: Eastern Acorn Press, 1982.
Gaede, Robert C., and Robert Kalin, Guide to Cleveland Architecture, Cleveland, Ohio: Cleveland Chapter of the American Institute of Architects, 1990.
Goode, James M., The Outdoor Sculpture of Washington D.C., Washington D.C.: Smithsonian Institution Press, 1974.
Hawthorne, Frederick W., Gettysburg: Stories of Men and Monuments, Hanover, Pennsylvania: The Association of Licensed Battlefield Guides, 1988.
Kuckro, Anne Crofoot, Hartford Architecture, Volume One: Downtown, Hartford, Connecticut: Hartford Architecture Conservatory, Inc., 1976.
Kvaran and Lockley, Guide to the Architectural Sculpture of America, unpublished manuscript
McDaniel, Joyce L., The Collected Works of Caspar Buberl: An Analysis of a Nineteenth Century American Sculptor, Wellesley, Massachusetts: MA thesis, Wellesley College, 1976.
Ovason, David, The Secret Architecture of Our Nation's Capital: the Masons and the building of Washington, D.C. New York City: Perennial, 2002.  

1834 births
1899 deaths
People from Kynšperk nad Ohří
People from the Kingdom of Bohemia
German Bohemian people
Austro-Hungarian emigrants to the United States
American people of German Bohemian descent
American architectural sculptors
Artists from Cleveland
People of New York (state) in the American Civil War
19th-century American sculptors
American male sculptors
Sculptors from Ohio
19th-century American male artists